Marcus Fabius Ambustus was Magister Equitum of the Roman Republic in 322 BC. The identification of him as the son of the consul M. Fabius Ambustus depends on a reference in Livy to the active military service of a cavalry officer serving under the dictator Aulus Cornelius Cossus Arvina, but T.R.S. Broughton finds it more likely that the three-time consul was himself the Magister Equitum carrying out administrative duties. Similarly, it is unclear if it was this M. Fabius who was the interrex appointed in 340 BC or if this should be attributed to his father the consul M. Fabius Ambustus or another consul of the Fabii, M. Fabius Dursuo.

See also
 Ambustus, for other men with the same cognomen
 Fabius Ambustus, for other men who used the same combination of gens name and cognomen
 Fabia gens, for a comprehensive list of gens members

References

Fabii Ambusti
Ancient Roman generals
Ancient Roman dictators
4th-century BC Romans
Magistri equitum (Roman Republic)